Vicky Safra (Athens, 1 July, 1952) is a Greek-born billionaire and philanthropist; and member of the Safra family.

Biography
Safra was born Vicky Sarfati (Βίκυ Σαρφάτη), the daughter of Fortunée (née Eskenazi) (1926–2015) and Alberto El Sarfaty (1914–2003). In 1969, she married Joseph Safra (1938–2020). Her husband died in 2020 leaving his fortune to her and their children.  She heads the Joseph Safra Philanthropic Foundation.

She is a citizen of Greece but lives in Crans-Montana, Switzerland. Jacob is responsible for the international operations (Safra National Bank of New York and J. Safra Sarasin of Switzerland) while David manages Banco Safra in Brazil.

According to the Forbes list of The World's Billionaires, as of October 2021, she is worth $7.5 billion. Her children are also billionaires worth collectively $7.1 billion. As of 2021, she is the richest woman in Greece.

References

Brazilian billionaires
Brazilian Jews
Greek Jews
Greek billionaires
Safra family
People from Athens
Living people
1952 births